Ulrich Alexander Boschwitz, pseudonym John Grane (April 19, 1915, Berlin – October 29, 1942, North Atlantic), was a German author.

Life
Boschwitz was the son of Salomon ‘Sally’ Boschwitz and Martha Ella, née Wolgast. Salomon was a wealthy Jewish factory owner who had converted to Christianity, in 1911, when he married Martha. Martha was descended from a prominent Lübeck patrician family, the Plitts, and had studied painting in Berlin and Munich. Salomon served in the Imperial German Army in World War I, but died on 7 May 1915, from a brain tumour, leaving Martha to raise Ulrich and his elder sister, Clarissa, and to carry on Salomon’s business.

In 1935, Boschwitz’s uncle, the lawyer Alexander Wolgast, was murdered in the street after criticizing the Nazi’s anti-semitic Nuremberg Laws. The same year, Boschwitz received draft orders to join the Wehrmacht. Shortly thereafter, Boschwitz and his mother fled Germany for Norway; his sister, Clarissa, had already left Germany, in 1933, for Palestine, where she would live the rest of her life.

In Norway, Boschwitz wrote his first novel, Menschen neben dem Leben (‘People Alongside Life’), which was first published in Swedish, under the pseudonym John Grane, as Människor utanför, in 1937. From Sweden, he and his mother moved to Luxembourg, France, and Belgium, before ending in Britain in 1939. In either Belgium or Luxembourg, in response to the horrors of Kristallnacht, he wrote Der Reisende (which was published in English as ‘The Man Who Took Trains’ (1939) in the United States and ‘The Fugitive’ (1940) in the United Kingdom). The book failed to make an impact after it was originally published and was out of print shortly thereafter. However, in the 2010s the book was rediscovered and re-released as "The Passenger". The revised and re-released edition was a massive success, being translated into over 20 languages and entering The Sunday Times top ten list of best selling hardbacks more than 80 years after it was originally published.

When WWII broke out, Boschwitz and his mother were arrested by the British, classified as ‘enemy aliens’, and interned on the Isle of Man. In July 1940, Boschwitz was deported to Australia, where he was interned at a camp in New South Wales. On the voyage there, on the HMT Dunera, a crew member threw the only draft of his latest work, Das Grosse Fressen (‘The Big Feast’), into the ocean. 

In Australia, Boschwitz worked on revising a second edition of Der Reisende and began a new novel, Traumtage (‘Dream Days’). In 1942, he was freed and allowed to return to Britain. On 29 October, the vessel he was on, MV Abosso, was torpedoed and sank by the German submarine U-575. Boschwitz, aged 27, was one of the 362 people onboard who died. His last works died with him.

Literary works
Posthumously, following the 2021 re-publication of Der Reisende, Boschwitz has been compared favourably to John Buchan, Franz Kafka, Thomas Mann, Heinrich Böll, and Hans Fallada.

His first novel, Menschen neben dem Leben (People Parallel to Life), recounts the lives of a variety of characters living through the post-First World War economic crisis in Germany. The novel was first published in a Swedish translation in 1937.

His second novel, Der Reisende, is set in Nazi Germany in November 1938 immediately after Kristallnacht. In 2021, the novel was published in a new translation by Philip Boehm, based on the original German manuscript and the author's own notes, and retitled The Passenger.

Neither book was published in the original German until 2018 (Der Reisende) and 2019 (Menschen neben dem Leben).

External Links 
Boschwitz's surviving papers eventually made their way to his sister, Clarissa. They were catalogued by Thomas Hansen in 1978 and donated and transferred to the Leo Baeck Institute, in 2013, by Boschwitz's niece, Reuella Shachaf-Saltzberg.

The collection includes various undated works, including poems, and correspondence and family photographs. They have been digitized and are available online as part of the CJH Holocaust Resource Initiative, made possible by the Conference on Jewish Material Claims against Germany.

Ulrich Boschwitz Collection, AR 25553, at the Leo Baeck Institute New York.

References

1915 births
1942 deaths
Exilliteratur writers
Jewish emigrants from Nazi Germany to Sweden
20th-century German writers
German civilians killed in World War II
People interned in the Isle of Man during World War II